Gerrard L. McGowan (died 17 August 1971) was an Irish Labour Party politician. 

As a child, he had to flee his home with his family when the Black and Tans torched it in 1920. A solicitor by profession, he was elected to Dáil Éireann as a Labour Party Teachta Dála (TD) for the Dublin County constituency at the 1937 general election. He did not contest the 1938 general election. His nephew Jim Glennon was a Fianna Fáil TD.

References

Year of birth missing
1971 deaths
Irish solicitors
Labour Party (Ireland) TDs
Members of the 9th Dáil
Politicians from County Dublin